Jidhafs is a city in  Bahrain. It was a municipality of Bahrain in the northern part of the country. Its territory is now in the Capital and Northern Governorate. It is about 3 km west of the capital Manama. It is neighbored by the villages of Al Daih and Sanabis to the north, Al Musala and Tashan to the south, Jibilat Habshi and Muqsha to the west. The city's population was 44,769 in 1991.

Etymology
The Bahraini historian and researcher Mohammed bin Ali Al Tajer states in his book Aqd Al Lalali Fi Tarikh Awal  that the word "Jid" translates to 'coast'. As such, the term 'Jid Hafs' is understood to translate to the "Coast of Hafs".

References

Populated places in the Northern Governorate, Bahrain
Former municipalities (regions) of Bahrain